Edwards Pond may refer to:

 Edwards Pond (New York), pond in New York
 Edwards Pond (West Virginia), pond in West Virginia